Mingus Lookout Complex is a fire tower lookout complex atop Mingus Mountain in Prescott National Forest, in Arizona.  It was listed on the National Register of Historic Places in 1988.

The fire tower is a  Pacific Coast Steel tower built in 1935. It replaced a  wooden tower.

It was listed on the National Register along with 41 other fire lookout towers in a batch in 1988.

References

Towers completed in 1935
Fire lookout towers on the National Register of Historic Places in Arizona
National Register of Historic Places in Yavapai County, Arizona